"3 Songs" is a 7-inch EP by Washington, D.C., post-hardcore band Fugazi. It was originally released in a collectors edition of 2,000 copies (800 on black vinyl, 1,200 in green vinyl) by Sub Pop Records as the December 1989 issue of their Singles Club.  Dischord Records gave the record wider release one month later with different cover and label art.  Later that year Dischord coupled the 3 Songs EP with the LP Repeater to make up the Repeater + 3 Songs CD.

"Song #1" was covered by Magnapop on their single "Slowly, Slowly".

Track listing

Personnel

 Ian MacKaye – vocals, guitar & piano
 Guy Picciotto – vocals
 Joe Lally – bass
 Brendan Canty – drums

References

Fugazi EPs
1990 EPs
Dischord Records EPs
Albums produced by Ted Niceley